Dragon Dice is a video game based on the collectible dice game Dragon Dice, developed by TSR and published by Interplay Entertainment in 1997.

Development
The game was in development as early as 1995.

Reception

The game received mixed reviews. Next Generation said, "Fans of the tabletop version of Dragon Dice would be better off finding a friend and using their money to purchase additional sets of real dice. It's a lot more fun than playing on the computer, and there's never a worry about the game crashing."

GameSpys retrospective said that "Interplay's Dragon Dice was an absolutely faithful translation" of the tabletop game, "meaning that players enjoyed the thrilling experience of watching video representations of dice roll around on a screen. At least when you play craps on the Internet, there's a chance of winning real money. The only reason to even own Dragon Dice was to get the exclusive collectable die that came bundled in the package – which isn't even a reason today as there are very few Dragon Dice players around."

References

External links
 Official website
 

1997 video games
Interplay Entertainment games
Strategy video games
Video games based on games
Video games developed in the United States
Windows games
Windows-only games